Malampuzha State assembly constituency is one of the 140 state legislative assembly constituencies in Kerala. It is also one of the 7 state legislative assembly constituencies included in the Palakkad Lok Sabha constituency. As of the 2021 assembly elections, the current MLA is A. Prabhakaran of CPI(M).

Local self governed segments
Malampuzha Niyamasabha constituency is composed of the following local self governed segments:

Members of Legislative Assembly
The following list contains all members of Kerala legislative assembly who have represented Malampuzha Niyamasabha Constituency during the period of various assemblies:

Key

Election results 
Percentage change (±%) denotes the change in the number of votes from the immediate previous election.

Niyamasabha election 2021

Niyamasabha election 2016 
There were 2,02,828 registered voters in the constituency for the 2016 election.

Niyamasabha election 2011
There were 1,80,648 registered voters in the constituency for the 2011 election.

See also

 Malampuzha
 Palakkad district
 List of constituencies of the Kerala Legislative Assembly
 2016 Kerala Legislative Assembly election

References

Assembly constituencies of Kerala
State assembly constituencies in Palakkad district